Imagination is the tenth studio album by American R&B/soul vocal group the Whispers, released on November 30, 1980, by SOLAR Records.

Overview 
The album contains two singles which made the U.S. Hot R&B charts: "It's a Love Thing", which peaked at number two in early 1981; and "I Can Make it Better".  Both singles were produced by SOLAR Records' main in-house producer Leon F. Sylvers III. Also featured in the album is "Up on Soul Train", the theme song used on the syndicated television series Soul Train from 1980 to 1983; it was composed by the creator, producer, and host of Soul Train, Don Cornelius.

The music video to the single "It's a Love Thing" is notable for having an early appearance from then-unknown actress Daphne Maxwell Reid. As of September 2016, the song appears in a L'Oreal commercial for Preference Mousse Absolue.

Track listing
 "Imagination" (Larry White, Grady Wilkins) - 6:15
 "It's a Love Thing" (Dana Meyers, William Shelby) - 5:10
 "Say You (Would Love for Me Too)" (Nicholas Caldwell) - 5:03
 "Continental Shuffle" (Mark Adam Wood, Jr.) - 4:34
 "I Can Make It Better" (Meyers, Shelby, Stephen Shockley) - 7:14
 "Girl I Need You" (White, Wilkins) - 4:18
 "Up on Soul Train" (Don Cornelius) - 5:18
 "Fantasy" (Werner Schuchner, Ahaguna Sun)  4:21

Personnel
 Wallace "Scotty" Scott, Walter Scott: lead vocals (tenor)
 Leaveil Degree (falsetto), Marcus Hutson (baritone): background vocals
 Nicholas Caldwell: background vocals (tenor), arranger, album concept
 Richard Aguon, Kirk Perkins, Wardell Potts Jr., Ahaguna Sun: drums
 Dean Boysen, Oscar Brashear, Bobby Bryant, John Parrish: trumpets
 Melvin Coleman, David Agent, Leon F. Sylvers III, Werner Schuchner: bass
 Emilio Conesa, Ernest "Pepper" Reed, Werner Schuchner, Stephen Shockley: guitar
 Albert DeGarcia, Joey Gallo, Kossi Gardner, Greg Phillinganes, William Shelby, Ricky Smith, Kevin Spencer, Grady Wilkins, Mark Adam Wood, Jr.: keyboards
 David Duke, Barbara Korn, Sidney Muldrew: French horns
 Fred Jackson, Ruben Laxamana, Sonny Lewis: saxophone
 Kraig Kilbey, Ross Wilson: trombones
 Melecio Megdaluyo: flute, saxophone

Charts

Weekly charts

Year-end charts

Singles

References

External links
 Imagination at Discogs
 Imagination at Rate Your Music

1980 albums
SOLAR Records albums
The Whispers albums